Bradley Smith (born 23 April 1997) is a Scottish footballer who plays as a midfielder for Scottish Junior Football East Region Super League club Broughty Athletic. He began his career with Dundee United, making his first team debut in May 2016. He was released in 2017 after a period on loan to Albion Rovers and subsequently also played for
Cowdenbeath.

Early life
Brad Smith was born in Dundee on 23 April 1997. He was at the Dundee United Academy for seven years before signing a professional contract in July 2013.

Playing career

Club
In December 2015, Smith signed a contract extension that would keep him at Dundee United until May 2018. He made his first team debut against Partick Thistle in a Scottish Premiership match on 10 May 2016. He was loaned out to Albion Rovers of Scottish League One in February 2017 until the end of the 2016–17 season. His contract with Dundee United was cancelled by mutual consent in August 2017.

Smith played for as a trialist for Cowdenbeath against Edinburgh City in Scottish League Two on 14 August 2017 and subsequently signed for the club. During the 2018–19 season, he was given an extended leave of absence from Cowdenbeath to concentrate on his studies in Dundee. He was allowed to leave the club in January 2019, joining Scottish Junior Football East Region Super League club Broughty Athletic for "a small fee".

Career statistics

References

External links

Living people
1997 births
Scottish footballers
Association football midfielders
Dundee United F.C. players
Scottish Professional Football League players
Footballers from Dundee
Albion Rovers F.C. players
Cowdenbeath F.C. players
Broughty Athletic F.C. players